Rodrigo Chávez Contreras (born 1 January 1960) is a Mexican politician affiliated with the National Regeneration Movement (formerly to the Citizens' Movement). As of 2013 he served as Deputy of the LXII Legislature of the Mexican Congress representing the Federal District as replacement of Martí Batres.

References

1960 births
Living people
People from Mexico City
Citizens' Movement (Mexico) politicians
Morena (political party) politicians
21st-century Mexican politicians
Deputies of the LXII Legislature of Mexico
Members of the Chamber of Deputies (Mexico) for Mexico City